The British Horseracing Authority, also known simply as the BHA, is the regulatory authority for horse racing in Great Britain.

It was formed on 31 July 2007, after the merger of the British Horseracing Board (BHB) and the Horseracing Regulatory Authority (HRA).

Its stated objectives are to: "provide the most compelling and attractive racing in the world; be seen as the world leader in raceday regulation; ensure the highest standards for the sport and participants, on and away from the racecourse; promote the best for the racehorse; and represent and promote the sport and the industry."

It is a member of the International Federation of Horseracing Authorities. The BHA's current chair is Joe Saumarez Smith, who succeeded Annamarie Phelps in the role in June 2022.

Overview
The British Horseracing Authority performs a number of functions. These include:
Race planning
Disciplinary procedures
Protecting the integrity of the sport
Licensing and registering racing participants
Setting and enforcing standards of medical care for jockeys and other participants
Setting and enforcing common standards for British racecourses
Research and improvements in equine science and welfare
Regulating point to point (steeplechase) racing in the UK
Compilation of the fixture list
Setting and enforcing the rules and orders of racing

Integrity

The Authority's Integrity Services Department performs some of its most well publicised duties. These include:
Identifying and deterring breaches of the Rules of Racing and malpractice in horse racing
Conducting investigations into breaches of the Rules of Racing
Gathering information in respect of potential wrongdoing in horse racing
Inspections of training establishments
Monitoring real-time betting markets for suspicious betting activity

Careers In Racing

Careers In Racing, (also known simply as CIR) is an industry owned brand managed by the Industry Recruitment & Training department of the British Horseracing Authority. Careers In Racing acts as the recruitment and training portal for horse racing and thoroughbred breeding in Great Britain. Careers In Racing was launched in 2005 in response to recommendation made by the Stable and Stud Staff commission chaired by Lord Donohugh. The commission highlighted the need for a governing body led recruitment and training strategy to help address staff shortages and improve retention of existing staff. Its  objectives are:
To promote racing as a potential career choice and job opportunity.
To provide a one stop shop for career information through the website CareersInRacing.com
To provide effective training and education to both new entrants’, existing staff and employers.
To work with the industry to develop and retain staff.

Its website was launched in January 2006 and gives an overview of the careers and training available within the Racing and Breeding industries, as well as offering a free online jobs board.

Training Initiatives include:
Stable Staff Programme run by the British Racing School (BRS) and the Northern Racing College (NRC) which sees hundreds of industry funded recruits complete an apprenticeship and take up jobs in racing yards across the country
A comprehensive training programme for jockeys including amateur riders and point-to-point riders at the British Racing School and the Northern Racing College
Racing Excellence is an industry accredited race series, supported by a qualified Jockey Coach, run under the Hands and Heels or Training Race conditions. These valuable series provide a vital support for young jockeys in developing their careers.
Staff Management Courses are run by the British Racing School and the Northern Racing College for supervisory staff and modules for trainers wishing to apply for their licences
The Graduate Development Programme sees a number of students take part in a comprehensive graduate scheme, which includes a two-week residential course, followed by a paid placement lasting around 8 weeks with a high profile organisation from the racing and breeding industries
The Overview of British Racing course is a one-day programme designed to provide delegates with an introduction to British racing and breeding. The programme is now seen by many areas of the industry as a key element for inducting new employees into their business
A Recruitment Campaign is put together yearly to address attracting new recruits into the industry which includes attending equine events, schools events and various other activities
RaceDay for schools was launched nationally to secondary schools in September 2008. This online teaching resource is a highly interactive curriculum based classroom activity that uses horseracing as a basis for teaching subjects such as Enterprise and Business Studies. The resource goes on to explain and promote various careers in racing and links to the main careers in racing website

Charity
Retraining of Racehorses

In April 2000, British Horseracing launched Retraining of Racehorses (RoR), the official charity for the welfare of horses who have retired from racing through injury, old age or a lack of ability.

References

External links
Careers In Racing
Retraining of Racehorses
Race Day For Schools
Love The Races
Racing For Change
Weatherbys
The Northern Racing College
The National Stud
The British Racing School

Horse racing organisations in Great Britain
Horse racing in Great Britain
Horseracing
2007 establishments in the United Kingdom